What time is it? is a 1989  Italian drama film directed by  Ettore Scola. It was co-produced with France.

Cast
 Marcello Mastroianni - Marcello, The Father
 Massimo Troisi - Michele, the son
 Anne Parillaud - Loredana
 Renato Moretti - Sor Pietro
 Lou Castel - Fisherman

Awards
4 Venice Film Festival awards: Including Best Actor to both Marcello Mastroianni and Massimo Troisi.

References

External links 
 

1988 films
Italian drama films
1980s Italian-language films
French drama films
1988 drama films
Films directed by Ettore Scola
Films scored by Armando Trovajoli
Films set in Italy
Films with screenplays by Ettore Scola
1980s Italian films
1980s French films